Peter Reuter (born December 4, 1944) is an American criminologist and economist. He is a professor in both the School of Public Policy and in the Department of Criminology at the University of Maryland. In 2020, he was appointed University of Maryland Distinguished Professor. Since 1985, his research has focused mainly on alternative drug policies in the United States and Western Europe. In 1988, he was described by Peter Kerr of the New York Times as "one of the few economists who studies illegal drug markets."

Career
After receiving his Ph.D. in economics from Yale University in 1980, Reuter began working at the RAND Corporation in 1981 as a senior economist in their Washington, D.C. office. In 1989, he founded the RAND Corporation's Drug Policy Research Center, and served as its director until 1993, when he left RAND to become a professor of criminology at the University of Maryland.

References

External links
Faculty page at the Department of Criminology
Faculty page at the School of Public Policy

Living people
American criminologists
University of Maryland, College Park faculty
Yale University alumni
University of New South Wales alumni
RAND Corporation people
1944 births
Winners of the Stockholm Prize in Criminology